= Tibet Tourism =

Chinese company

- Type: Public; Private-owned
- Founded: 1996; 30 years ago
- Website: www.600749.com

Tibet Tourism (Chinese: 西藏旅游), full name Tibet Tourism Co., Ltd. (Chinese: 西藏旅游股份有限公司) is a tourism company. Established in 1996, the company primarily manages tourist attractions and provides tourism-related services. The company owns subsidiaries in the sectors of food, entertainment, lodging, retail, and transportation. It is listed on the Shanghai Stock Exchange.
